Bernard Pichery (born 24 March 1953) is a French sailor. He competed in the Tornado event at the 1984 Summer Olympics.

References

External links
 

1953 births
Living people
French male sailors (sport)
Olympic sailors of France
Sailors at the 1984 Summer Olympics – Tornado
Place of birth missing (living people)